is a Chinese-born Japanese actress. She has been nominated for four Japanese Academy Awards, and won the 1981 Outstanding Performance by an Actress in a Supporting Role prize for her performance in Zigeunerweisen. She began her career as a film ingenue using the stage name Michiyo Yasuda, under which she scored major early successes with films such as A Fool's Love and numerous love stories and "samurai" period piece dramas.

Selected filmography
 Zatoichi's Pilgrimage (1966)
A Fool's Love (1967)
 The Yoshiwara Story (1968)
 Lady Sazen and the Drenched Swallow Sword (1969)
 Onna Gokuakuchō (1970)
 Lone Wolf and Cub: Baby Cart in the Land of Demons (1973)
 Zigeunerweisen (1980)
 Kagero-za (1981)
 Location (1984)
 Shinran: Path to Purity (1987)
 Bedtime Eyes (1987)
 Yumeji (1991)
 Face (2000)
 Zatōichi (2003)
 Akame 48 Waterfalls (2003)
 Hanging Garden (2005)
 Spring Snow (2005)
 The Two in Tracksuits (2008)
 The Fallen Angel (2010)
 Someday (2011)
 I'm Flash! (2012)
 I Never Shot Anyone (2020)

Honours
Kinuyo Tanaka Award (2011)

References

External links
 

1946 births
Living people
Japanese actresses
People from Tianjin
Actresses from Tianjin